Dominic Muldowney (born 19 July 1952 in Southampton) is a British composer.

Biography
Dominic Muldowney studied at the University of Southampton with Jonathan Harvey, at the University of York (with Bernard Rands and David Blake), and privately with Harrison Birtwistle. From 1974 to 1976 he was composer-in-residence to the Southern Arts Association. In 1976 he was invited by Birtwistle to become Assistant Music Director of the Royal National Theatre in London. He succeeded Birtwistle as Music Director in 1981, remaining in that post until 1997.

Muldowney's orchestral music includes a number of concerti (for piano, saxophone, oboe, violin, percussion, trumpet and trombone), many of which explore his fascination with polyrhythms. Other works include Three Pieces for Orchestra (1991), the song cycle Lonely Hearts (1988) and three full-length ballets, including The Brontës (1994).
Muldowney’s radio opera The Voluptuous Tango (1996) won the Prix Italia in 1997, and the Gold Award for Best Radio Drama at 1997 Sony Drama Awards, and received its stage premiere in Hoxton New Music Days, London in 2000.

Muldowney has written much music for TV, radio and film including The Ploughman’s Lunch (1983), Nineteen Eighty-Four with Richard Burton (1984), The Ginger Tree (1989), Sharpe (1993), The Peacock Spring (1996), King Lear (1997), Bloody Sunday (2002) and Copenhagen (2002).  He has written and arranged for David Bowie and Sting.  He is published by Carlin Music Corporation and Faber Music.

Until 2006 Muldowney taught composition at the Royal Academy of Music in London.

Television and film credits
 Betrayal (Spiegel/Pinter - Horizon Films) - Producer: Sam Spiegel - Director: Hugh David Jones
 The Ploughman's Lunch - Director: Richard Eyre
 Loose Connections (Umbrella) - Director: Richard Eyre
 Nineteen Eighty-Four (Virgin Films) - Director: Michael Radford
 Singleton's Pluck - Director: Richard Eyre
 The Beggar's Opera (Alan Ladd Company) - Director: Richard Eyre
 Defence of the Realm (Enigma) - Director: David Drury
 Baal - Director: Alan Clarke - starring David Bowie
 The Black Candle - Director: Roy Battersby
 Tales From Hollywood - Director: Howard Davies
 Black Daisies For The Bride - Director: Peter Symes - Prix Italia Prize Winner
 The Peacock Spring - Director: Christopher Morahan
 Emma - Director: Richard Eyre
 The Moth - Director: Roy Battersby
 The Fix - Director: Paul Greengrass
 Sharpe’s Enemy/Sharpe’s Company/Sharpe’s Honour Sharpe’s Return/Sharpe’s Revenge/Sharpe’s Waterloo Sharpe’s Rifles /Sharpe’s Eagle (Central TV) - Director: Tom Clegg
 Eskimo Day - Director: Piers Haggard
 King Lear - Director: Richard Eyre
 Bloody Sunday (Granada) - Director: Paul Greengrass
 Copenhagen - Director: Howard Davies
The Blasphemers' Banquet (1989)

Selected Recordings
 Piano Concerto (Peter Donohoe/BBC Symphony Orchestra/Mark Elder) (EMI)
 Saxophone Concerto (John Harle/London Sinfonietta)/Diego Masson (EMI)
 Oboe Concerto (Roy Carter/LSO)/Michael Tilson Thomas (NMC)

Bibliography
Kennedy, Michael (2006), The Oxford Dictionary of Music, 985 pages,  
Dominic Muldowney, Opera and the voice: once more with meaning

References

External links
 

1952 births
Living people
20th-century classical composers
21st-century classical composers
English classical composers
Academics of the Royal Academy of Music
Alumni of the University of Southampton
Alumni of the University of York
Musicians from Southampton
English male classical composers
20th-century English composers
21st-century English composers
20th-century British male musicians
21st-century British male musicians